The Çatalca Peninsula lies in the European section of Turkey (Thrace), extending from the southeast Balkans and separating the Black Sea from the Sea of Marmara on the western side of the strait of Bosphorus.  Approximately two thirds of Istanbul, one of the most populous cities of the world, occupy its eastern part.

Geography
The peninsula is roughly rectangular. It is bordered by the Black Sea to the north, Sea of Marmara to the south and Bosphorus to the east. The west border is more or less arbitrary, but usually taken to correspond with the western border of İstanbul Province. In fact, the geographers consider it to be a part of the Kocaeli–Çatalca subregion. There are several natural and artificial lakes in the Çatalca peninsula including Lake Durusu, Lake Büyükçekmece and Lake Küçükçekmece.

History 
During the reign of Byzantine Emperor Anastasius I (491-518) a defense wall had been constructed between Evcik beach at the north and Silivri at the south to defend İstanbul (then known as Constantinople) from Huns and other attackers. The  wall was one of the longest ramparts of Europe. But even then such attackers as Avars (616), Bulgarians (813) and Pechenegs (1090) were able to lay siege to İstanbul. After 1371, most of Çatalca Peninsula fell to Ottoman Turks. The whole peninsula became a part of Ottoman Empire by the conquest of İstanbul in 1453. Since then Çatalca Peninsula is a Turkish land except for Bulgarian attack during the first Balkan war and temporary occupation by Greece at the end of the First World War.

Population and economy 
Çatalca Peninsula (together with Kocaeli Peninsula at the other side of Bosphorus) is the most industrialised region of Turkey. Approximately two thirds of İstanbul, one of the most populous cities of the world with 13.120.596  inhabitants  constitute the population of Çatalca Peninsula . The population density of the peninsula exceeds 2000/km2 (5180/ mi2).

References

Peninsulas of Turkey
Marmara Region
Landforms of Istanbul Province